Structured storage is computer storage for structured data, often in the form of a distributed database. Computer software formally known as structured storage systems include Apache Cassandra, Google's Bigtable and Apache HBase.

Comparison
The following is a comparison of notable structured storage systems.

See also
 NoSQL

References

Structured storage
structured storage